Czech Republic women's junior national softball team is the junior national under-17 team for Czech Republic. The team competed at the 1999 ISF Junior Women's World Championship in Taipei, Taiwan where they finished thirteenth.  The team competed at the 2003 ISF Junior Women's World Championship in Nanjing, China where they finished twelfth.  The team competed at the 2011 ISF Junior Women's World Championship in Cape Town, South Africa where they finished ninth. The team competed at the 2013 ISF Junior Women's World Championship in Brampton, Ontario where they finished thirteenth.

References

External links 
 International Softball Federation

Softball
Women's national under-18 softball teams
Softball in the Czech Republic
Youth sport in the Czech Republic